André Kana-Biyik (born 1 September 1965) is a former Cameroonian footballer who played as a defender. The brother of François, he started a professional career in 1986 with Diamant Yaoundé. From 1988 to 1994 he played in France Ligue 1 with FC Metz and Le Havre AC, making 93 appearances and scored 8 goals. With the Cameroon national football team he participated at the 1990 and 1994 FIFA World Cups.

Kana-Biyik was sent off in Cameroon's opening game of the 1990 World Cup, a game against Argentina that Cameroon won 1–0. His brother, François Omam-Biyik, scored the goal that defeated the South Americans.  Having been suspended for the second match against Romania following his red card in the first, he returned to the team, and picked up yellow cards both in the third group-stage match against the USSR (a heavy defeat, but irrelevant since they were already guaranteed qualification), and the second-round match against Colombia (an extra-time victory): and was thus suspended for a second time in the tournament, for the quarter-final against England - thus becoming the first and so far only player to serve two suspensions in a single World Cup tournament.  His son Jean-Armel Kana-Biyik, is also a professional footballer.

References

External links

1965 births
Living people
Cameroonian footballers
Association football midfielders
Diamant Yaoundé players
FC Metz players
Le Havre AC players
Ligue 1 players
Expatriate footballers in France
1990 FIFA World Cup players
1994 FIFA World Cup players
1986 African Cup of Nations players
1988 African Cup of Nations players
1990 African Cup of Nations players
1992 African Cup of Nations players
Africa Cup of Nations-winning players
Cameroon international footballers
Cameroonian expatriate footballers
Cameroonian expatriate sportspeople in France